Bogdan Stoyanov born 24 March 1987 is a Bulgarian footballer currently playing for FC Pirin Blagoevgrad as a midfielder.

Stoyanov made one appearance for Pirin during the 2008–09 A PFG season.

References

External links
 Profile at football database

Bulgarian footballers
1987 births
Living people
Association football midfielders
PFC Pirin Blagoevgrad players